Beerbongs & Bentleys Tour was the second concert tour by American rapper Post Malone in support of his second album, Beerbongs & Bentleys (2018). The tour began in Portland on April 26, 2018, and concluded in Leeds on August 25, 2019.

Background and development 
On February 20, 2018, the rapper first announced tour dates for North America starting on April 26, 2018 in Portland, a day before the album was set to release. 21 Savage, SOB X RBE, and Paris were announced as opening acts for North America.  Dates were also announced for festivals in Europe.

Following the release of the "Better Now" music video, on October 9, 2018, the rapper announced dates for Europe starting on February 14, 2019 in Dublin.

On October 22, 2018, dates for Oceania were announced starting on April 26, 2019 in Perth. Jaden Smith and Tyla Yaweh were announced as opening acts.

Set list
This set list is from the concert on April 26, 2018 in Portland. It is not intended to represent all shows from the tour.

"Too Young"
"Over Now"
"Takin' Shots"
"Spoil My Night" 
"No Option"
"Big Lie"
"Deja Vu"
"Psycho" 
"Candy Paint" 
"92 Explorer"
"I Fall Apart"
"Up There"
"Feeling Whitney"
"Stay"
"Jonestown"
"Rich & Sad"
"Go Flex"
"Rockstar" 
Encore
"White Iverson"
"Congratulations"

Tour dates

Accolades

Notes

References

External links

2018 concert tours
2019 concert tours